The Ministry of Justice of the Republic of Poland is one of the ministries of Poland.

From 1956 to 1957, Zofia Wasilkowska was the first female to serve as a Minister of Justice in Poland's history.

Each Minister of Justice between 1990 and 2010 and since 2016 has also been Public Prosecutor General.

List of ministers

Ministers of Justice (1989-present)

See also

 Justice ministry
 Politics of Poland

References

External links
 Ministry of Justice of the Republic of Poland official site 

Poland
Justice